Big Dogs is an American crime drama TV series created by Adam Dunn based on his More series of novels.

Cast

Main
 Brett Cullen as Captain McKeutchen
 Manny Perez as Sixto Santiago
 Michael Rabe as More
 Louis Carbonneau as Liesl
 Dennis Flanagan as Turse
 Micheál Richardson as Renny

Recurring
 Imran Sheikh as Arun
 Lance Henriksen as Totentatz

Episodes

Development
In May 2017, it was announced Choice Films and Adam Dunn's Aurelian Productions were teaming to develop Big Dogs, a new drama series based on Dunn's futuristic crime books, with director David Platt (Law & Order: Special Victims Unit) attached to helm the first two episodes. Each book in Dunn's More series of novels will be the basis for its own season.

Casting
In July 2017, it was announced Lance Henriksen, Ana Isabelle and Micheál Richardson had joined the cast.

References

External links
 

2021 American television series debuts
English-language television shows
Fictional portrayals of the New York City Police Department
Television shows filmed in New York City
Amazon Prime Video original programming